Gianfranco Contini (4 January 1912 – 1 February 1990) was an Italian academic and philologist.

He studied at the Collegio Mellerio Rosmini in Domodossola, then at the University of Pavia, where he graduated in 1933. Later, he studied also in Turin, where he met Giulio Einaudi, Massimo Mila, and Leone Ginzburg, who shortly after started the Einaudi's publishing company. From 1934 to 1936, he lived in Paris, following Joseph Bédier's lessons, then he was called to teach in Florence and Pisa, where he became a contributor to "Letteratura", a literary magazine where he shared his views, among others, with Eugenio Montale, and where he began to collaborate with the Accademia della Crusca. In 1938, he was called to teach Romance Philology at the University of Freiburg, as a successor of Bruno Migliorini. Among his students, there have been the critics D'Arco Silvio Avalle and Dante Isella. After 20 years of brilliant academic activity, he was appointed at the University of Florence, and to the Scuola Normale Superiore di Pisa. He was also associated to the Académie des Inscriptions et Belles-Lettres.
He directed the Centre of Philology Studies of the Accademia della Crusca, until March 1971. He belonged to the Accademia dei Lincei, and was President of the Società Dantesca Italiana. In 1987, he went back to his home-town where he died three years later.

Selected bibliography
Dante Alighieri, Rime (editor), 1939
Poeti del Duecento (editor), 1960
Letteratura dell'Italia unita 1861-1968 (editor), 1968
Francesco De Sanctis, Scelta di scritti critici e ricordi (editor), 1969
Varianti e altra linguistica, 1970 (collection literary essays 1938-68)
Un'idea di Dante, 1970
Carlo Emilio Gadda, La cognizione del dolore (introduction), 1970
Altri esercizi, 1972 (collection of literary essays, 1942–71)
Roberto Longhi, Da Cimabue a Morandi (editor), 1973
Esercizi di lettura sopra autori contemporanei con un’appendice su testi non contemporanei, 1974 (partially published before as Un anno di letteratura, 1942)
Una lunga fedeltà. Scritti su Eugenio Montale, 1974
Francesco Petrarca, Canzoniere (introduction), 1975
Letteratura italiana del Quattrocento (editor), 1976
Letteratura italiana delle origini (editor), 1978
Eugenio Montale, L'opera in versi (editor), 1980
Letteratura italiana del Risorgimento 1789-1861 (editor), 1986
Ultimi esercizî ed elzeviri, 1987 (collection of literary essays, 1968–87)
Antologia leopardiana (editor), 1988
Carlo Emilio Gadda, Lettere a Gianfranco Contini a cura del destinatario 1934-67, 1988 (letters edited as addressee)
Quarant'anni di amicizia: scritti su Carlo Emilio Gadda (1934-88), 1989
Breviario di ecdotica, 1990
Poeti del Dolce stil novo (editor), 1991
Racconti della Scapigliatura piemontese (editor), 1992
La letteratura italiana Otto-Novecento (editor), 1998
Postremi esercizi ed elzeviri, 1998 (latest collection of essays)
Poesie, Pietro Montorfani ed., 2010
 Massimo Colella, Gianfranco Contini e Francesco Orlando: un’idea di Dante, un’idea della letteratura, in «Xenia. Trimestrale di Letteratura e Cultura» (Genova), IV, 3, 2019, pp. 20–32.

References

1912 births
1990 deaths
Academic staff of the University of Freiburg
Italian literary critics
Italian male non-fiction writers
Italian philologists
Members of the Académie des Inscriptions et Belles-Lettres
Academic staff of the University of Florence
University of Turin alumni
Academic staff of the Scuola Normale Superiore di Pisa
20th-century philologists